Charalambos "Bambos" Kyriacou is Professor of Behavioural Genetics at the University of Leicester. He is a fellow of Academy of Medical Sciences (United Kingdom).  In 2023 he was a guest on The Life Scientific on BBC Radio 4.

Education
Kyriacou received a bachelor's degree in biology from the University of Birmingham in 1973.

References

Royal Society Wolfson Research Merit Award holders
1953 births

Living people
Academics of the University of Leicester
Fellows of the Academy of Medical Sciences (United Kingdom)
People from the London Borough of Camden